Monumento a la Madre may refer to:

 Monumento a la Madre, Guadalajara, Jalisco
 Mother's Monument, Mexico City